Mansfield is an unincorporated community and census-designated place on the border between Brown and Spink counties, South Dakota, United States. The population was 86 according to the 2020 census.

Additionally, this area is widely known for its large variety of game and is a popular pheasant hunting venue.

Demographics

History
Mansfield was named for John Mansfield, who owned the land where the community is located. John Mansfield was also credited with bringing the railroad to the site.

References

Census-designated places in South Dakota
Unincorporated communities in Brown County, South Dakota
Unincorporated communities in South Dakota
Aberdeen, South Dakota micropolitan area